Acheleia is a village in the Paphos District of Cyprus, located near to Paphos International Airport. A water canal runs through the village.

References

Communities in Paphos District